Herminius Carl George Ludolf "Minus" Polak (12 May 1928 – 4 February 2014) was a Dutch lawyer, politician and judge. As a politician Polak served at different times as a member of the municipal council of Rotterdam, alderman of the same city and Senate of the Netherlands between 1966 and 1985 for the People's Party for Freedom and Democracy. As a judge he served first in the kanton court of Rotterdam and later in the Council of State of the Netherlands.

Career
Born in Rotterdam in 1928, Polak's father was a university professor of business administration and rector at the Netherlands School of Economics (later Erasmus University Rotterdam), his mother was a doctor. Minus Polak studied Dutch law at the University of Amsterdam until 1953. He then returned to Rotterdam to work as a lawyer.

In 1966 he went into politics and stopped working as a lawyer. He was elected to the municipal council of Rotterdam and at the same time he was made alderman concerning infrastructure and public works. In 1974 he resigned his position as alderman after a conflict concerning funding for the airport of Zestienhoven. The municipal council held him responsible for the airport, but refused to provide him with the money to buy a firetruck. Polak felt that without the firetruck he could not provide the safety that was needed and therefore chose to resign. He did however continue on as a member of the municipal council for another two years. Shortly after resigning as alderman he took up the position of President of the Board of the Erasmus University Rotterdam, the same university his father was once rector of. Two years into his presidency he was elected to the Senate, and two weeks after becoming a member of that institution his membership of the municipal council of Rotterdam ended. Polak would serve for just over one year as senator, until September 1977.

Earlier in 1977 his presidency of the board of the university ended and he took up his job as a lawyer once more. One year later, in 1978, he would also be elected to the municipal council of Rotterdam again. In 1983 Polak quit as a lawyer and became a judge in the kanton court of Rotterdam. In 1985 he ended both his function as a judge in the kanton court and as a member in the municipal council. He then became a member of the Council of State of the Netherlands, the highest court of the Netherlands regarding decisions taken by the executive government. Polak would serve between 1985 and 1995.

Polak was made Officer of the Order of Orange-Nassau on 27 November 1985.

Near the end of his life Polak was nearly deaf. He died of myocardial infarction on 4 February 2014.

References

1928 births
2014 deaths
Aldermen of Rotterdam
20th-century Dutch judges
Lawyers from Rotterdam
Members of the Council of State (Netherlands)
Members of the Senate (Netherlands)
Municipal councillors of Rotterdam
Officers of the Order of Orange-Nassau
People's Party for Freedom and Democracy politicians
University of Amsterdam alumni